Comet Humason, formally designated C/1961 R1 (a.k.a. 1962 VIII and 1961e), was a non-periodic comet discovered by Milton L. Humason on September 1, 1961. Its perihelion was well beyond the orbit of Mars, at 2.133 AU. The outbound orbital period is about 2516 years. The diameter of its comet nucleus is estimated at around 30−41 km.

It was a "giant" comet, much more active than a normal comet for its distance to the Sun, with an absolute magnitude of 1.5−3.5, it could have been up to a hundred times brighter than an average new comet. It had an unusually disrupted or "turbulent" appearance. It was also unusual in that the spectrum of its tail showed a strong predominance of the ion CO+, a result previously seen unambiguously only in Comet Morehouse (C/1908 R1).

References

External links 
 
 

Non-periodic comets
1961 in science
Astronomical objects discovered in 1961